Sentinel Mountain is an 8,245-foot-elevation (2,513 meter) summit in Glacier County, Montana, United States.

Description 

It is situated in the Lewis Range, seven miles northwest of landmark Chief Mountain, and approximately 15 miles east of the Continental Divide. Precipitation runoff from the mountain drains into tributaries of the Belly River. The mountain's toponym was officially adopted in 1929 by the United States Board on Geographic Names.

Geology 

Like other mountains in Glacier National Park, Sentinel Mountain is composed of sedimentary rock laid down during the Precambrian to Jurassic periods.

Climate 
According to the Köppen climate classification system, Sentinel Mountain is located in an alpine subarctic climate zone with long, cold, snowy winters, and cool to warm summers. Winter temperatures can drop below −10 °F with wind chill factors below −30 °F. Due to its altitude, it receives precipitation all year, as snow in winter, and as thunderstorms in summer.

See also

 Mountains and mountain ranges of Glacier National Park (U.S.)
 Geology of the Rocky Mountains

References

External links 
 Weather forecast: Sentinel Mountain

Mountains of Glacier County, Montana
Mountains of Glacier National Park (U.S.)
Lewis Range
Mountains of Montana
North American 2000 m summits